The butterflies of New Zealand include twelve endemic species, as well as several introduced and migrant species. Lepidoptera, which includes the butterflies and moths, is the third largest insect order in New Zealand.

Species list

Conservation
Very little is known about any butterfly extinctions since human settlement of New Zealand since they leave few remains. The majority of New Zealand invertebrates are found in forests, so it is possible that some butterflies became extinct due to the large scale forest clearance after human settlement.

See also
List of Lepidoptera of New Zealand
Fauna of New Zealand
Environment of New Zealand

References

Further reading

External links
New Zealand Butterfly Species
Te Ara - the Encyclopedia of New Zealand - "Butterflies and moths"
New Zealand Entomological Society
Monarch Butterfly NZ Trust

 
01
New Zealand
Butterflies
New Zealand
New Zealand
New Zealand
New Zealand, Butterflies